Samuel Burgess (born 14 December 1988) is an English former professional rugby league footballer who played as a  or  forward in the 2000s and 2010s.

He played in England for the Bradford Bulls in the Super League and in Australia for the South Sydney Rabbitohs in the NRL. The Rabbitohs won the 2014 NRL Premiership, the club's first in 43 years, and Burgess was named winner of the Clive Churchill Medal for man of the match in the Grand Final. he played for Great Britain and England at international level.

In late 2014, Burgess switched codes to play rugby union for Bath. He was called up to the England national team in August 2015, becoming a dual-code international, and was a member of England's squad for their unsuccessful 2015 Rugby Union World Cup campaign, before returning to rugby league for the 2016 NRL season.

On 30 October 2019, Burgess announced his retirement due to a shoulder injury. Burgess currently works as an assistant coach for the South Sydney Rabbitohs.

Background
Burgess, also known by the nickname of "Slammin' Sam", is one of four rugby league-playing brothers; younger brothers Tom and George are teammates at the Rabbitohs, while older brother Luke retired after playing in England and Australia.

Early life
Burgess was born on 14 December 1988 in Liversedge, Kirklees, West Yorkshire, England. His late father, Mark Burgess, who died of motor neurone disease, was also a rugby league footballer who played for Nottingham City, Rochdale Hornets, Dewsbury and Hunslet; while his mother, Julie, is a teacher, currently employed at The Scots College in Bellevue Hill, Sydney. His older brother, Luke, and younger twin brothers, Tom and George, are also professional rugby league footballers.

He attended Heckmondwike Grammar School. He played his junior rugby for Hunslet Parkside, Dewsbury Moor and also played for Liversedge Cricket Club.

Rugby league

Bradford Bulls

Burgess made his Super League début against Leeds in 2006 after already being dubbed by Shontayne Hape as "Great Britain's Sonny Bill". After a highly successful début season with the Bulls, Burgess was awarded the Senior Academy Player of the Year Award by the club. In 2007 Burgess established himself as a first team regular. After a great full season he was called up for the Great Britain squad for the 2007 Test series with New Zealand, and was named as young player of the year in the Super League. Burgess made his Great Britain début against New Zealand in the 1st test in October 2007, scoring a try. Burgess also played in the centenary match between the All Golds and Northern Union; he was awarded the Man of the match. He gained attention for his big hit on New Zealand prop Fuifui Moimoi during the Kiwis' 2007 tour when he was only 19 years old.

At the end of 2008's Super League XIII, Burgess was forced to rule himself out contention for the England 2008 World Cup squad because of injury.

In September 2009, the South Sydney Rabbitohs announced they had signed Burgess on a four-year deal from the 2010 season. Burgess, on contract at the Bradford Bulls until the end of the 2010 season, was released after the clubs agreed on a compensation fee. South Sydney co-owner and A-list celebrity Russell Crowe persuaded Burgess to choose his club over others that were competing for his signature, after inviting Burgess and his mother to the set of Robin Hood, which he was filming in England at the time.

Burgess, in his last game in the UK before moving to the NRL, played a prominent role in the final of the 2009 Four Nations tournament, scoring two tries in England's defeat by Australia.

South Sydney

Before he had played a game for South Sydney Burgess played  for the NRL All Stars in the inaugural All Stars match after Rabbitohs prop Dave Taylor injured his ankle at training. It was played at Skilled Park on the Gold Coast on 13 February 2010. The NRL All Stars lost the game 16–12.

He was selected to play for England against France in the one-off test in 2010.

Burgess was given a one-week ban by the NRL Judiciary for a grade one grapple tackle. He was placed on report during Round 21, against the Canterbury Bulldogs, for a grapple tackle made on Canterbury fullback Ben Barba. Burgess therefore missed the Round 22 clash against Wests Tigers. This suspension came at a fairly pivotal time in the season, as forwards Michael Crocker, Luke Stuart, Scott Geddes, and Dave Taylor had all been ruled out from the clash already.

Burgess continued to represent England at the end of the season in the 2010 Four Nations tournament. His shoulder was injured in the first game of the 2011 NRL season against the Roosters on 11 March, for which he needed surgery and a month of rest. However, as soon as he came back from that, he injured his ankle and is out for the remainder of 2011.

In August 2013, the Burgess brothers became the first set of four brothers to line up in the same Australian side since Ray, Roy, Rex and Bernard Norman played for Sydney's Annandale club during the 1910 NSWRFL season. That year, Burgess was banned for two games following his infamous "squirrel grip" on Will Chambers – where Chambers's testicles were grabbed during a game. Sam was in a DVD about his life called 'Slammin' Sam: The Sam Burgess Story' After the 2013 NRL season Burgess represented England in the 2013 World Cup.

On 17 February 2014, it was announced that at the end of the year Burgess would switch to rugby union. In what was his last match for South Sydney, Burgess, along with brothers Tom and George played against the Canterbury-Bankstown Bulldogs in the 2014 NRL Grand Final. Despite suffering a broken cheekbone in the first tackle of the game, Burgess continued to play on, with his team winning the match. He was awarded the Clive Churchill Medal for best player in the grand final. Taking into account the retrospective Clive Churchill medal awarded to Ron Coote in 1971, Sam Burgess was the first South Sydney player to claim the medal in 43 years.

Rugby union
Burgess was signed for Bath Rugby in England's top competition on a three-year contract, starting from October 2014. His start date was then delayed until December 2014 due to complicated surgery to fix a fractured cheek and eye socket. He was seen by the English rugby union as their answer to Sonny Bill Williams – a big ball-playing rugby league forward who can transfer those skills to the backline midfield in union.

He scored his first try for Bath in the 13th round of the Premiership against Wasps at the Recreation ground and was awarded man of the match.
On 21 January, he was named in the England Saxons squad to play the Irish Wolfhounds.
On 10 April, Burgess started in the Aviva Premiership against Newcastle Falcons at blindside flanker. Burgess completed the most turnovers of any player in the matches of that round.

On 10 August, Burgess was named in the England Elite Squad to make his International début against France at Twickenham on 15 August, in a warm-up match for the Rugby World Cup. He started the game which England won 19-14.
Following his appearance where he was sin-binned, World Cup winning English scrum half Matt Dawson commented:
"You can't take him to the World Cup for me. He played 80 mins and credit for that. But the way the game went in the second half there was nothing for him to do. The great thing about Burgess is he doesn't make mistakes with ball in hand. But unfortunately, if you're going to be really picky, positionally he wasn't great. He played like a six rather than a 12. There are things that are instinctively he doesn’t know what to do." Dawson's comments came before Lancaster named Burgess as one of four centres including Henry Slade to represent England in the World Cup. His inclusion and performances at the World Cup were widely scrutinized, and seen by some pundits as partly to blame for England's "humiliating" early pool stage exit from the tournament—the worst result for a host nation in the tournament's history. Burgess in 2018 claimed ""If people actually re-watched the games I participated in you will see I added to the team. What cost us an early exit was individual egos and selfish players not following our leader." England led Wales 25-18 when Burgess was substituted in the 70th minute in his final game for England.	
	
On 5 November, Burgess made the decision to leave rugby union, opting to return to South Sydney Rabbitohs, signing a three-year contract.

Rugby league return
In early November 2015 it was reported that Burgess had been signed to the South Sydney Rabbitohs for $1.5m AUD per season. This figure would make him the highest paid rugby league footballer of all time and in the top three highest paid of either code. In December 2015 Burgess was selected to play for the World All Stars in the 2016 Rugby League All Stars Match alongside his brother Tom Burgess.

In October 2016, Burgess was named in the 24-man England squad for the 2016 Four Nations tournament. 

He was also announced the new captain under new coach Wayne Bennett after original captain Sean O'Loughlin was unavailable through injury.

In October 2017 he was selected in the England squad for the 2017 Rugby League World Cup. In the week leading up to the final, Burgess was made captain as Sean O'Loughlin pulled out with injury. England went on to lose the final to Australia 6-0.  On 6 December 2017, it was announced that Burgess had agreed to a contract extension with Souths keeping him at the club until the end of 2019.

On 5 September 2018 Burgess signed a four-year contract with Souths keeping him at the club until the end of the 2023 season.  The new contract deal coincided with Souths returning to form in The NRL with the club finishing third on the table at the end of the regular season.  The following week, Burgess and South Sydney were embroiled in an off field incident involving Souths players exposing themselves on Instagram to a female fan back in May 2018.  A report by The Daily Telegraph verified social media accounts belonging to Burgess were at the centre of the saga.
On 21 September 2018, Burgess was cleared by the NRL of any wrongdoing.  Burgess then spoke to the media saying “I have not sexted anyone, I fully co-operated with the inquiry as I said I would. I have engaged lawyer Chris Murphy to pursue my remedies and he has retained defamation lawyers".

Burgess started the 2019 NRL season strongly as Souths won 10 of their first 11 games.  Following Souths Round 13 loss against Newcastle, Burgess was ruled out with a shoulder injury.  It was later revealed that Burgess needed a drip inserted into his heart to fight an infection after shoulder surgery and was ruled out from playing indefinitely.

Burgess returned to the Souths side for their Round 20 match against Cronulla which Souths lost 39-24 at Shark Park.  Burgess was placed on report during the match after hitting Cronulla player Matt Moylan with a high tackle.

On 21 August 2019 Burgess was voted as one of the best players of the decade in the NRL team of the decade announcement which spanned from the 2010 to 2019 seasons.  The panel who voted were made up of Premiership-winning coaches Phil Gould, Craig Bellamy, Trent Robinson and Ricky Stuart along with Hall of Famers Peter Sterling, Darren Lockyer, Danny Buderus and Laurie Daley.

In round 25 of the 2019 NRL season, Burgess was replaced on report in South Sydney's victory over arch rivals the Sydney Roosters.  Burgess was alleged to have pulled the hair of Easts player Billy Smith.  Burgess was later suspended for one match over the incident.

On 18 September 2019, Burgess was asked by NRL CEO Todd Greenberg to meet with him and show cause as to why he should not be reprimanded for an outburst he made about criticism in relation to the NRL judiciary.  In an interview with the media Burgess said "Everyone seems to be in uproar about this judiciary system, “Who is making the calls here? Is there a discussion before these calls go out there? I don’t know. What’s the process? It’s like a kangaroo court in there".

At the end of the 2019 regular season, South Sydney finished in third place on the table and qualified for the finals.  Burgess missed the qualifying final against the Sydney Roosters due to his suspension in round 25.  Burgess returned for the elimination semi-final against Manly-Warringah which Souths won 34-26 at ANZ Stadium.  The following week, Burgess played in South Sydney's 16-10 preliminary final loss against Canberra at Canberra Stadium.

On 30 October 2019, Burgess was forced into early retirement due to a chronic shoulder injury.  Burgess released a statement saying "To all South Sydney members and fans, fans of the game and even the supporters that aren't my biggest fans, I'd like to thank each and every one of you for making my career what it was in the NRL, I have loved absolutely every minute; the highs, the lows; the Grand Final; coming home; my injuries; my dates with the judiciary. It really has been a fantastic ride".

Honours

Rugby league
NRL Winner: 2014
Clive Churchill Medal Winner: 2014
George Piggins Medal Winner: 2014
Jack Rayner Players' Player Award Winner: 2014
Bob McCarthy Clubman of the Year Award Winner: 2014
Burrow Appreciation Award Winner: 2014
2019: NRL team of the decade member 2010-2019.

Rugby union
Aviva Premiership Runner-up: 2014/15

Personal life
In December 2015, Burgess married Phoebe Hooke in a lavish ceremony at her parents estate in the Southern Highlands of New South Wales. The couple welcomed their daughter, Poppy Alice Burgess, on 24 January 2017. They welcomed their son, William "Billy" Mark Burgess, on 9 December 2018. The couple separated less than a month after their son was born. They reconciled some time in April 2019 but split for a second time in October 2019. Shortly after their separation, an apprehended violence order (AVO) was taken out against Burgess on behalf of his father-in-law, Mitchell Hooke.

Burgess later pleaded not guilty to charges of intimidation and common assault and claimed the allegations made by his ex-wife were "born out of malice or retaliation". On 5 February 2021, Burgess was found guilty of intimidating his former father-in-law, Mitchell Hooke. On 19 March 2021, Burgess had his conviction for intimidating his former father-in-law overturned on appeal.

On 22 February 2021, Burgess was arrested by police and charged with driving offences which included driving an unregistered vehicle and driving without a valid licence.  Burgess also failed a random roadside drug test.  Burgess was later ordered to appear in court on 4 May 2021.

On 20 October 2021, Burgess was cleared of all charges against him in relation to a year-long investigation into allegations of abuse levelled by his ex-wife.  A statement read “NSW Police Operational Legal Advice unit just recommended no criminal prosecution(s) be preferred against Sam Burgess in relation to these allegations. That now concludes this investigation".

References

External links

South Sydney Rabbitohs profile
Rabbitohs profile
(archived by web.archive.org) Sam Burgess Official Player Profile
Statistics at rlwc2017.com

1988 births
Living people
Bath Rugby players
Bradford Bulls players
Burgess family
Clive Churchill Medal winners
Dual-code rugby internationals
England international rugby union players
England national rugby league team captains
England national rugby league team players
English rugby league players
English rugby union players
Great Britain national rugby league team players
NRL All Stars players
People educated at Heckmondwike Grammar School
People from Liversedge
Rugby league locks
Rugby league players from Dewsbury
Rugby league props
Rugby league second-rows
Rugby union centres
Rugby union players from Dewsbury
South Sydney Rabbitohs captains
South Sydney Rabbitohs players